Arkel is a town in the province of South Holland, Netherlands. A part of the municipality of Molenlanden, it lies about 3 km north of Gorinchem. Arkel is a former municipality; in 1986 it became part of Giessenlanden.

In 2017, the village of Arkel had 3.445 inhabitants. The built-up area of the village was 0.42 km² and contained 1.125 residences.
The statistical area "Arkel", which also includes the surrounding countryside, has a population of around 3220. Though there are little places of cultural interest in Arkel, there is a 19th-century domed church and a 19th-century windmill.

History
Although nowadays a modest village, in the Middle Ages it was the origin of the renowned Lords of Arkel, who owned considerable territories including the town of Gorinchem.

Transportation

Arkel is served by Arkel railway station. It is located north of the town.

References

Former municipalities of South Holland
Populated places in South Holland
Molenlanden